Unit Oka 9420 was the central  Epidemic Prevention and Water Purification Department of the Southern Expeditionary Army Group of the Imperial Japanese Army. Formed in 1942 to support the Japanese Southern Army, Unit 9420 consisted of two units; the Umeoka Unit, which specialized in the plague, and the Kono Unit, which specialized in malaria. Most of its work involved preventing the spread of disease in Singapore.

Commanded by Major General Kitagawa Masataka, the unit was headquartered in the Permai Hospital in Tampoi, Johor, near the southern tip of the Malay Peninsula, 13 km northeast of Johor Bahru and Singapore, with some evidence that it also had sub-units operating in Thailand and working on unknown diseases. Coupled with its work on the plague, the unit was also responsible for rat catching.

According to the testimony of politician Othman Wok, Singapore was also an important biological weapons (BW) base. A laboratory was established there within days of the Japanese conquest. It became one of the largest of the BW installations outside of mainland China. Initially, Unit 9420 was under the command of Hareyama Yoshio, but in 1942, Lieutenant Colonel Naito Ryoichi, one of Ishii's most trusted colleagues, assumed control of the facility for several years. It was staffed with approximately 150 physicians and scientists, and produced huge quantities of pathogens annually. Naito and his staff worked primarily with typhus, plague, and pesticides. It is unknown whether Singapore was a BW research facility, or whether it was simply a laboratory employed to produce pathogens for use elsewhere.

References

Japanese biological weapons program
Imperial Japanese Army
Japanese human subject research
History of Singapore
Japanese war crimes